Blue Nude (Souvenir of Biskra) ("Nu bleu, Souvenir de Biskra"), an early 1907 oil painting on canvas by Henri Matisse, is located at the Baltimore Museum of Art as part of the Cone Collection.

Matisse painted the nude when a sculpture he was working on shattered.  He later finished the sculpture which is entitled Reclining Nude I (Aurore).

Matisse shocked the French public at the 1907 Société des Artistes Indépendants when he exhibited Blue Nude (Souvenir de Biskra). Blue Nude was one of the paintings that would later create an international sensation at the Armory Show of 1913 in New York City.

The painting, which may be classified as Fauvist, was controversial; it was burned in effigy in 1913 at the Armory Show in Chicago
, to where it had toured from New York. In 1907 the painting had a strong effect on Georges Braque and Pablo Picasso, partially motivating Picasso to create Les Demoiselles D'Avignon.

See also
 100 Great Paintings, 1980 BBC series

References

External links
 The Cone Collection

1907 paintings
Fauvism
Nude art
Paintings by Henri Matisse
Paintings in the collection of the Baltimore Museum of Art
Post-impressionist paintings